Mangataboahangy is a town and commune in Madagascar. It belongs to the district of Ambatofinandrahana, which is a part of Amoron'i Mania Region. The population of the commune was estimated to be approximately 8,000 in 2001 commune census.

Only primary schooling is available. It is also a site of industrial-scale  mining. The majority 95% of the population of the commune are farmers.  The most important crop is rice, while other important products are peanuts, beans, maize and cassava. Services provide employment for 5% of the population.

References and notes 

Populated places in Amoron'i Mania